Vonnegut, Wright & Yeager was an architectural firm active in mid-twentieth-century Indiana. The firm was organized in 1946 as a partnership between the surviving partners of three Indiana firms: Kurt Vonnegut Sr. (1884–1957) of  Vonnegut, Bohn & Mueller Architects; George Caleb Wright (b. April 25, 1889) of Pierre & Wright; and Ralph Oscar Yeager (b. August 16, 1892) of Miller & Yeager. It was located at 1126 Hume Mansur Building, Indianapolis, Indiana and 402 Opera House Building, Terre Haute, Indiana.

History
Vonnegut, Wright & Yeager was formed in 1946. In 1957, after the death of partner Kurt Vonnegut Sr., George Caleb Wright left the firm to become senior partner in the Indianapolis firm Wright, Porteus & Lowe.

Works by Vonnegut, Wright & Yeager
Stalker Hall, Indiana State University, built to designs by Ralph Oscar Yeager in 1954 for $920,000 (renovated 2004-2006)

Works by Miller & Yeager

Coca-Cola Company Building, Terre Haute, Indiana, built for $200,000
Terre Haute Post Office and Federal Building, built for $450,000
Terre Haute City Hall, built for $250,000 
Woodrow Wilson Junior High School (1927), built for $750,000
First Church of Christ Scientist (Terre Haute, Indiana), built for $175,000
YMCA (Terre Haute, Indiana), built for approximately $275,000
Zorah Shrine (Terre Haute, Indiana), built for $300,000
Union Hospital (Terre Haute, Indiana), built for $375,000

Works by Pierre & Wright Architects
Indiana State Library and Historical Building, Indianapolis, Indiana
Milo Stuart Memorial Building, Arsenal Technical High School (Indianapolis, Indiana)

Works by Vonnegut, Bohn & Mueller
Indiana Bell Telephone Building in Indianapolis, Indiana
The first building of All Souls Unitarian Church (Indianapolis, Indiana), 1453 N. Alabama Street  
Anderson Bank building in Anderson, Indiana  
New buildings for Hooks Drug Stores prior to World War II. 
Kurt Vonnegut, Sr. Residence 4365 North Illinois Street, Indianapolis (c.1929)., Indianapolis 4th Ward Washington Township, Marion County, Indiana. 
Kurt Vonnegut, Sr. Residence (Williams Creek, Indiana) (1941)

References

Architecture firms based in Indianapolis
Defunct companies based in Indianapolis
Beaux Arts architects
Art Deco architects
Vonnegut family
Design companies established in 1946
1946 establishments in Indiana
Companies disestablished in the 1950s
1950s disestablishments in Indiana